is a passenger railway station in located in the city of Kuwana, Mie Prefecture, Japan, operated by the private railway operator Kintetsu Railway.

Lines
Kintetsu-Nagashima Station is served by the Nagoya Line, and is located 19.5 rail kilometers from the starting point of the line at Kintetsu Nagoya Station.

Station layout
The station consists of two opposed side platforms, connected by a level crossing.

Platforms

Adjacent stations

History
On January 1, 1940, the Sangu Express Electric Railway and the Kansai Express Electric Railway merged, and the station was renamed . After merging with Osaka Electric Kido on March 15, 1941, the line became the Kansai Express Railway's Nagoya Line, and the station was again renamed back to its original name. This line was merged with the Nankai Electric Railway on June 1, 1944 to form Kintetsu, and the station renamed to   The station name was shortened to its present name on March 1, 1970

Passenger statistics
In fiscal 2019, the station was used by an average of 1665 passengers daily (boarding passengers only).

Surrounding area
JR Tokai Kansai Main Line Nagashima Station
Nagashima Castle Ruins

See also
List of railway stations in Japan

References

External links

Kintetsu: Nagashima Station 

Railway stations in Japan opened in 1938
Railway stations in Mie Prefecture
Stations of Kintetsu Railway
Kuwana, Mie